Ancyroclepsis rhodoconia is a moth of the family Tortricidae. It is found in Nepal, China (Likiang) and Vietnam.

References

Moths described in 1976
Archipini
Moths of Asia
Taxa named by Alexey Diakonoff